Carlton Molesworth (February 15, 1876 – July 25, 1961) was a Major League Baseball pitcher. Molesworth played for the Washington Senators in the 1895 season. He played just four games in his career, having two losses in three games started with a 14.63 ERA.

He also scouted for the Pittsburgh Pirates for 30 years.

Molesworth was born in and died in Frederick, Maryland.

References

External links

1876 births
1961 deaths
19th-century baseball players
Washington Senators (1891–1899) players
Pittsburgh Pirates scouts
Major League Baseball pitchers
Baseball players from Maryland
Chattanooga Lookouts players
Montgomery Black Sox players
Montgomery Senators players
Birmingham Barons players
Birmingham Barons managers
Sportspeople from Frederick, Maryland
Palmyra Mormans players